The Chattanooga Times Free Press is a daily broadsheet newspaper published in Chattanooga, Tennessee, and is distributed in the metropolitan Chattanooga region of southeastern Tennessee and northwestern Georgia. It is one of Tennessee's major newspapers and is owned by WEHCO Media, Inc., a diversified communications company with ownership in 14 daily newspapers, 11 weekly newspapers and 13 cable television companies in six states.

History

Chattanooga Times
The Chattanooga Times was first published on December 15, 1869, by the firm Kirby & Gamble. In 1878, 20-year-old Adolph Ochs borrowed money and bought half interest in the struggling morning paper. Two years later when he assumed full ownership, it cost him $5,500. In 1892, the paper's staff moved to the Ochs Building on Georgia Avenue at East Eighth Street, which is now the Dome Building. In 1896, Ochs entrusted the management of the paper to his brother-in-law Harry C. Adler when he purchased The New York Times (circulation 20,000). Ochs remained publisher of the Chattanooga Times. Ochs' slogan, "To give the news impartially, without fear or favor" remains affixed atop the paper's mast today. The Times was controlled by the Ochs-Sulzberger family until 1999.

Chattanooga Free Press
In 1933, Roy Ketner McDonald launched a free Thursday tabloid, delivered door to door, featuring stories, comics, and advertisements for his stores. Three years later, circulation had hit 65,000 per week, making some ad revenue. On August 31, the paper began publishing as an evening daily with paid subscriptions. One year later, the Free Press circulation reached 33,000, within reach of another p.m. competitor, The Chattanooga News (circulation 35,000). McDonald acquired The Chattanooga News from George Fort Milton Jr. in December 1939, when the majority bondholders of the News, specifically Milton's step-mother Abby Crawford Milton, and her three children, acted on a technical missed payment deadline of bond payment obligations—allowing them to foreclose on the paper. Despite heroic sacrifice and fundraising by George Fort Milton and his employees, payments to the creditors were rejected as they had already agreed to sell the paper to Roy McDonald of rival publisher of the Free-Press for $150,000. McDonald then appropriated the News name to prevent Milton from using it, and the Free Press became the News-Free Press. In their guide to writing, The Elements of Style, Strunk and White used the paper as an illustration of comically misleading punctuation, noting that the hyphen made it sound "as though the paper were news-free, or devoid of news."

Competition and agreement

By 1941, News-Free Press daily circulation reached 51,600, surpassing the Times, with 50,078. In competition, the Times began an evening newspaper competitor, the Chattanooga Evening Times. One year later, however, the competing newspapers joined business and production operations, while maintaining separate news and editorial departments. The Times ceased publishing in the evening and the News-Free Press dropped its Sunday edition. The two shared offices at 117 E. 10th St.

Twenty-four years later, McDonald withdrew from the agreement. He bought the Davenport Hosiery Mills building at 400 E. 11th St. in 1966, and competition resumed between the two papers. The News-Free Press was the first paper in the nation to dissolve a joint operating agreement. That August, the day after the News-Free Press resumed Sunday publication, the Times responded with an evening newspaper: the Chattanooga Post. The following year, the Post ceased publication. The News-Free Press gave Chattanooga its first full-color newspaper photos.

Each newspaper won a single Pulitzer Prize. In 1956, Charles L. Bartlett of the Washington Bureau of The Chattanooga Times won the Pulitzer Prize for National Reporting, for articles leading to the resignation of the secretary of the Air Force, Harold E. Talbott. In 1977, staff photographer Robin Hood of the Chattanooga News-Free Press received the Pulitzer Prize for Feature Photography. The photo was of legless Vietnam veteran Eddie Robinson in his wheelchair watching a rained-out parade in Chattanooga with his tiny son on his lap.

When business declined for the News-Free Press, 14 employees mortgaged their homes to help keep the newspaper afloat. In the late 1970s, Walter E. Hussman, Jr., the 31-year-old publisher of the Arkansas Democrat, approached McDonald for counsel regarding a bitter struggle with the Arkansas Gazette. In 1980, the Times and the News-Free Press entered into a new joint operating agreement. In 1990, after leading the paper for 54 years, McDonald died at age 88. Three years later, the paper returned to its original name: the Chattanooga Free Press.

Chattanooga Times Free Press
In 1998, Hussman bought the Free Press. A year later, he bought the Times as well and merged the two papers. The first edition of the Chattanooga Times Free Press was published on January 5, 1999. The Times Free Press runs two editorial pages: one staunchly liberal, the other staunchly conservative, reflecting the editorial leanings of the Times and Free Press, respectively. The Tennessee Press Association recognized the Times Free Press as the best newspaper in Tennessee in 2002. One year later, Editor and Publisher magazine named the Times Free Press as one of 10 newspapers in the United States "doing it right". The newspaper has subscribers in southeastern Tennessee and northern Georgia. On Monday, April 14, 2014, the Chattanooga Times Free Press was named a finalist for the 2014 Pulitzer Prize for Local Reporting for "Speak No Evil." In 2017, the newspaper was named a finalist for the Pulitzer Prize for "The Poverty Puzzle."

Website

When the Chattanooga Times Free Press launched its website in 2004, the site was only accessible to paid subscribers and featured only a handful of section pages and links. Four years later, in early 2008, the redesigned online presence of timesfreepress.com debuted, with an emphasis on breaking news, video and multimedia. The site features all local content in the paper, an online edition of the news product, and classified ads, as well. In late 2010, the newspaper launched "Right 2 Know", an online database of police mugshots, salaries of government employees, and a map of shootings in Hamilton County, but in August 2020, the newspaper removed the database, noting that the information published rarely met the newspaper's editorial standard of newsworthiness.

Other publications
The Times Free Press is also responsible for several other niche publications:
 Chatter – a monthly magazine launched in 2008 with feature stories from around the area
 "Get Out" – a monthly magazine focused on everything outdoor in Chattanooga and the surrounding area
 "Edge" – a monthly magazine focused on local business
 Noticias Libres – a free weekly Spanish language paper distributed around the Chattanooga area
 ChattanoogaNow – a weekend publication distributed in every Thursday's Times Free Press that covers music, movies, dining and arts
 "Dining Out" – a weekly publication focused on food and restaurants

Current and past publishers and contributors
 Jeff Deloach, immediate past president
 Charles L. Bartlett, reporter, Washington bureau, The Chattanooga Times, 1946–1962. Pulitzer Prize winner for national reporting, 1956, for articles leading to the resignation of Secretary of the Air Force Harold E. Talbott.
 Clay Bennett, Editorial cartoonist, combined papers, 2007–. Pulitzer Prize winner for editorial cartooning in 2002 at the Christian Science Monitor.
 Bill Dedman, Copy boy, copy editor, reporter for The Chattanooga News-Free Press and then The Chattanooga Times, 1977–1983. Pulitzer Prize winner, investigative reporting, 1989.
 J. Todd Foster, editor, combined papers, 2010–2011. Editor of the Bristol Herald-Courier when it won the 2010 Pulitzer Prize for Public Service.
 Tom Griscom, executive editor and publisher, combined papers, 1999–2010.
 Ruth Holmberg, publisher, The Chattanooga Times. Granddaughter of Adolph Ochs, and mother of author Arthur Golden and Michael Golden, publisher of the International Herald Tribune.
 Robin Hood, photographer, The Chattanooga News-Free Press, 1970s. Pulitzer Prize winner for feature photography, 1977.
 Roy McDonald, publisher, The Chattanooga Free Press and later The Chattanooga News-Free Press, 1933–1990.
 Jon Meacham, reporter, The Chattanooga Times, 1991–1992. Pulitzer Prize winner for biography, 2009.
 Albert Hodges Morehead, reporter, The Chattanooga Times, c. 1930.
 Alan Murray, reporter, The Chattanooga Times, c. 1977. Assistant managing editor and columnist, The Wall Street Journal.
 Adolph Ochs, publisher, The Chattanooga Times, 1878–1935. Later publisher of The New York Times. Died on a visit to Chattanooga.
 Julius Ochs Adler, president and publisher, The Chattanooga Times. General manager of The New York Times.

See also
 List of newspapers in Tennessee

References

External links

 

Newspapers published in Tennessee
Mass media in Chattanooga, Tennessee
1869 establishments in Tennessee